SWBI may refer to:
Barreirinha Airport (ICAO: SWBI), an airport in Brazil
Smith & Wesson (Nasdaq: SWBI), an American firearms manufacturer